The Feuerletten Formation is a geological formation in Germany. It dates back to the late Norian.

Vertebrate fauna

See also
 List of dinosaur-bearing rock formations

References

Triassic System of Europe
Norian Stage